Valerik Apinian (4 April 1950 - 28 July 2019) was an Armenian and Russian artist.

Biography 
Valerik Apinyan was born April 4, 1950 in the village of Mayisyan (Armenia). He graduated from school in 1967. He studied at Leninakan Art College, Leningrad Higher School of Industrial Art, Mukhina from 1973 to 1976. He was a free listen  at the Institute of Painting, Sculpture and Architecture. IE Repin (Academy of Arts). He was a member of the Russian Artists' Union since 1976. He had more than 20 personal exhibitions, participated in over 200 exhibitions in Russia and the world. For a long time he lived and worked in Germany and Sweden. The main collection of works were painted in oil, as well as many works with tempera. He worked with graphics, painted the theater curtains for theaters, as for example, at the Mariinsky theater. Workshops are located in St. Petersburg near Mariinsky theater, and in the Armenian city of Gumri.

Personal life 
Valerik was born into a family of school teachers in Leninokan city. He was married to Tamara Krivko-Apinian*http://ru.hayazg.info/Апинян_Тамара_Антоновна, Professor of Philosophy and art history and the author of books on the philosophy and history of music. Valerik and Tamara have two sons. He lived in St. Petersburg.

Collections 
His works are collected by
The State Russian Museum, St. Petersburg
The National Museum of Armenia, Yerevan
The Museum of modern art Armenia, Yerevan
In private Museum collections
Frank Reiche Munich
Tamara Oloffson, Sweden
Rönesans Holding Erman Ilicak, Turkey
More than 350 works of oil are located in private collections in Russia, USA and Europe

Personal exhibition 
 11.05.2015.300 s Armenian community. Gallery at the Armenian Church of St. Petersburg
 04.04.2011. Museum of Modern Art Armeni. Erevan
 30.10.2006. Galerie Venome Paris France
 12.04.2001. Freiraume Berlin, Germany
 25.10.2001.main(central) exhibition hall Manege St. Petersburg
 18.11.1997. Stockholm Galerie Stockholm Sweden
 06.10.1996. Galerie Annachrista Kroll Düsseldorf Germany
 07.12.1996. Galerie Von Der-Leage Aachen Germany
 25.11.1994. Aachen Germany Municipality
 16.11.1994. Cologne Germany Municipality
 17.06.1994. Galerie Am Aubach Berlin, Germany
 05.12.1991. Exhibition Center of the St. Petersburg Union of Artists
 17.12.1991. Tamara Oloffson galerie and kulturnamnden Pitea, Sweden
 14.12.1990. Wolgang Tumulka Galerie Munich
 09.12.1990. Galerie Von Der-Leage Aachen Germany

References

External links 
 apinian.com - home page
 Facebook
 Հայաստանում արարված նկարներ (տեսանյութ)
 http://www.trezzini-hotel.com/news-18.htm
 http://www.houzz.ru/pro/arsenapinian/apiniancom

Armenian artists
Russian artists
1950 births
2019 deaths